New Zealand coal reserves are in excess of 15 billion tonnes, mainly in Waikato, Taranaki, West Coast, Otago and Southland. Over 80% of the reserves are in Southland lignite deposits. These were worth $100 billion in 2010.

Mining

See also 
 Coal mining
 Mining in New Zealand

References

Further reading

External links 
 

Mining in New Zealand
Coal in New Zealand